The 2019–20 season of the Belgian First Division B began in August 2019 and was scheduled to end in April 2020 but will eventually conclude on 2 August 2020 with the return leg of the promotion playoff. 

Since mid-March all matches had been postponed due to the coronavirus pandemic, which was just a few days before the return leg of the promotion play-offs was to be played. A few weeks later, Lokeren was declared bankrupt and ceased to exist, while both Roeselare and Virton were refused a professional football license due to financial difficulties, meaning they were both relegated and no relegation play-offs were necessary. On 15 May 2020, the general meeting of the Belgian Pro League clubs decided to end the season, with the exception of the return leg of the promotion play-offs. OH Leuven and Beerschot were forced to find a date and location for the return leg to decide promotion, before the start of the 2020–21 season on 7 August 2020. In case both teams did not come to an agreement, or the COVID-19 pandemic prevented the match to be played in time, Westerlo will be promoted instead as team which scored the most points overall. As the Belgian health safety council has prohibited sports competitions until the end of July and public events until the end of August, the match was scheduled to be played behind closed doors in the first weekend of August, just a few days before the start of the next season. Just two days before the match was scheduled to take place, the decision was overturned and instead the Belgian First Division A was expanded to 18 teams, meaning both Beerschot and OH Leuven were promoted. The final was still played to determine the champion.

Team changes

In
 Lokeren were relegated from the 2018–19 Belgian First Division A after finishing in last place. The club returns to the second level of Belgian football for the first time since 1996.
 Virton were promoted as 2018–19 Belgian First Amateur Division winners, returning to the second level for the first time since the 2015–16 season.

Out
 2018–19 Belgian First Division B Mechelen were initially not promoted as they were found guilty of match-fixing as part of the 2017–19 Belgian football fraud scandal. The club however appealed the decision with the Belgian Arbitration Court for Sports which ruled that as part of the general rules set by the Royal Belgian Football Association that match-fixing in a prior season could not be punished by relegation in the current season and hence Mechelen could not be denied their promotion, whether they were guilty or not.
 Tubize after finishing in last place in the relegation playoffs.

Format changes
While the regular season format remains unchanged, consisting of two separate round-robin tournaments, the end of season playoff system has been altered somewhat, specifically the Europa League playoffs will now be played by 16 instead of 12 teams, meaning that now the top six teams in the aggregate standings of the First Division B will take part in these playoffs, including the team which has gained promotion. Until the 2018–19 season, only the three highest finishers (not including the promoting team) would enter.

As a consequence, from this season on only two teams will not enter the Europa League playoffs, namely the bottom two teams in the aggregate standings. Instead of a relegation tournament with the bottom four teams as was previously the case, now only these two teams will play the relegation playoffs, in which both teams will meet up to five times in a row, in a system similar to the one used a few seasons ago in the 2014–15 Belgian Pro League, with the team which finished 7th during the regular season starting with a three-point bonus and hosting three of the five home matches. The team with the fewest points after five matches will be relegated to the 2020–21 Belgian First Amateur Division.

Team information

Stadiums and locations

Personnel and kits

Managerial changes

League table

Opening tournament

Closing tournament

Aggregate table

Promotion play-offs
The winners of the opening tournament and the closing tournament compete in a two-legged match to determine the division champion, who will be promoted to the 2020–21 Belgian First Division A. The team finishing highest in the aggregate table will host the return leg. In case a single team wins both the opening and the closing tournament, that team will be promoted automatically and no play-offs will be organized.

On 8 November 2019, OH Leuven assured itself of winning the opening tournament following an away win at Virton. As such OH Leuven was certain of playing at least the promotion play-offs at the end of the season. On 21 February, following a loss against Union SG, OH Leuven could no longer win the closing tournament, meaning that promotion play-offs will be necessary to determine the overall champion. One week later, Beerschot won the second period, becoming the opponent of OH Leuven in the promotion play-offs. 

After the first leg was played, the second leg was postponed due to the COVID-19 pandemic. Mid-May, the Belgian association of professional football clubs decided that the second leg should take place behind closed doors in the first weekend of August to determine the champion and promoting team, on 2 August 2020. In case the final match could not be played, Westerlo would be promoted as the team with the most points in the aggregate table. However, on 31 July 2020, just two days before the actual final match, the decision was overturned and instead the 2020–21 Belgian First Division A would be expanded to 18 (from 16) teams, meaning both OH Leuven and Beerschot would be promoted. It was decided the promotional final would still be played to determine the champion of the 2019–20 Belgian First Division B.

Summary

|}

First Leg
The first match saw Beerschot starting strong, with Kenneth Schuermans nearly deflecting a free-kick by Raphael Holzhauser into his own goal in just the first minute. OH Leuven replied with a long ball to Mathieu Maertens who saw the ball tackled away from him in last instance by Joren Dom, else he would have had a free run on goal. With 20 minutes played, Frédéric Frans also almost scored an own goal, after deflecting a free kick against the cross bar with Mike Vanhamel beaten, but a few seconds later on the other end it was his teammate Tarik Tissoudali opening the score for Beerschot, after first holding off former Beerschot player Jan Van den Bergh and then slotting in the ball past Laurent Henkinet. From that moment, Beerschot took over, forcing Henkinet to several saves, twice through a Joren Dom header, once after a shot by Marius Noubissi.

At the start of the second half, Vincent Euvrard brought on offensive winger Yannick Aguemon with the hope of creating more chances, but it was Beerschot who nearly scored immediately after the break, with Frans getting a free header after a Tissoudali run, but being unable to reach the ball completely, harmlessly sending it over the bar. From that moment, OH Leuven got more and more into the match, but both Kamal Sowah and Thomas Henry forgot to send a pass to Jérémy Perbet, who twice ran well to find the open space but did not get the ball. Beerschot suddenly scored a second goal, again through Tissoudali, but saw it disallowed by the VAR for offside. OH Leuven kept pushing for an away goal, but both Maertens (not enough power behind the shot) and Aguemon (shot wide) failed their attempts. Ten minutes before time, Henry got the best chance for OH Leuven, but his close-range header was miraculously saved by Vanhamel with an instinctive reflex.

Second Leg
In an empty stadium in Leuven, and no longer with the promotion at stake as both clubs were now certain of being promoted, Beerschot took the initiative in the first minutes of the second leg, with minor attempts by Tissoudali and Noubissi before OH Leuven took control. Both Maertens and Henru had efforts on goal which were saved by Vanhamel, while Sowah aimed a long-range strike against the bottom of the crossbar with Vanhamel beaten, but just inches too high for the opening goal. Beerschot was suffering, but took the lead out of the blue just before half time, as a sharp corner kick by Holzhauser resulted in an own-goal following a deflection by Schuermans, the scoreline not reflecting the flow of play going into the break. OH Leuven now needed three goals, but was not as efficient as Beerschot, as early in the second half Frédéric Duplus fumbled and allowed Tissoudali to easily tap in the second goal. Ten minutes later Noubissi scored the third from a sharp angle. In the final minutes, Perbet scored the consolation goal for the home team through a header, while Euloge Placca Fessou set the final score at 1–4. Beerschot thus won the tie by an aggregate score of 5–1, becoming 2019–20 Belgian First Division B champions, while OH Leuven was promoted as well.

Matches

Play-offs III
The relegation playoffs, more commonly known as playoffs 3, were scheduled to be played by the two bottom teams in the overall season standings. These two teams would play a separate competition, playing each other five times between 20 March and 26 April, with the team which finished higher during the regular season starting with three bonus points and home advantage in the first match.

On 16 February 2020, following a 0–2 loss against Virton, Lokeren could no longer avoid these playoffs. One week later, following a draw away to Roeselare, Lokeren was also sure of finishing last and thus would start with a three-point deficit. On the final matchday on 28 February 2020, Roeselare only drew away to Lommel, meaning they would have become the opponents of Lokeren in Play-offs III.

Initially, these playoffs were postponed due to the coronavirus pandemic, but in the end, they were canceled as on 20 April 2020 Lokeren was declared bankrupt and ceased to exist. Following a merge with KSV Temse a new club was created, Lokeren-Temse, starting at the fourth level (Belgian Second Amateur Division). As such, Roeselare would have been saved, but three weeks later on 11 May 2020 they were refused a professional football license, meaning they were still relegated to the 2020–21 Belgian First Amateur Division.

Season statistics

Top scorers

Team of the season
Upon completion of the regular season a team of the season award was compiled, based upon the results of the team of the week results throughout the season, constructed based on nominations from managers, assistant-managers, journalists and analysts. The results were announced from 23 March 2020, with one player revealed each day.

Number of teams by provinces

References

2019-20
2019–20 in European second tier association football leagues
2
Belgium